Jesus Is Lord Church Worldwide (JILCW), or more commonly known as Jesus Is Lord Church (JIL), is a Christian megachurch based in the Philippines. It describes itself as a Full Gospel, Christ-centred, and Bible-based church, with 5 million members in 60 countries as of 2018. Most members abroad are overseas Filipino workers and their families.

Originating in Manila, it now hold its main services in Ortigas Center, Polytechnic University of the Philippines-Manila, Greenhills, San Juan and Bocaue, Bulacan.

History 

The Jesus Is Lord Church (JIL) began in 1978 when Eddie Villanueva, a former atheist, activist, and professor, gathered with 15 Bible study members at the Polytechnic University of the Philippines (then known as Philippine College of Commerce). As professor of Economics and Finance at the university, Villanueva preached the Gospel to his students.

From 15 students, JIL has grown to over 5 million members and has planted churches all over the Philippines and in other countries in neighbouring Asian countries, Europe, Australasia, the Americas, the Middle East, and Africa. JIL is also reaching many millions more through its TV, radio, literature, video ministries, ICare, the JIL Christian Schools/JIL Colleges Foundation, Inc. and through the JIL

JIL Church Worldwide celebrated its 39th anniversary in Quirino Grandstand, Rizal Park, Manila, last October 27, 2017 with the theme "Know Your God".

Ministries

Life Group Network 
The Life Group Network (LGN) is an arm of the JIL ministry that recognizes the reality that the life of the church is its people. Lifegroups are small groups that provide both formal and non-formal approaches of ministering and equipping. These small groups would form networks that cater to the relational needs of specific age groups: the Children's Net, the Kristiyanong Kabataan para sa Bayan (Christian Youth for the Nations), the Young Adults Network, the Men's Net and the Women's Net.

KKB/CYN 

Its youth ministry is known as the Kristiyanong Kabataan para sa Bayan – Christian Youth for the Nation Movement (KKB-CYN) and has members of the age group of 13 to 22. It is active in campus evangelism and is focused on interacting with students. It is headed by Senator Joel Villanueva who was elected in 2016.

JIL Worship 
JIL Worship (also known as Musikatha), is a Christian recording ministry and the main music arm of the Jesus Is Lord Church that publishes and produces inspirational and life-transforming praise and worship songs. It began on 1996 through JIL's home-grown musicians, singers, and songwriters. More known and widely used praise and worship albums are Banal Mong Tahanan, Be Unto You, Pupurihin Ka Sa Awit, Harana sa Hari, Pagsambang Wagas, Wildfire, Speechless and with featured albums for the children, the youth and for just any God-seeking soul. JIL Worship seeks to serve the highest goal of music, by leading JIL and other churches to experience God-honoring and Spirit-directed worship encounters through concerts, conferences and seminars, music and worship ministry skills trainings. Today, Musikatha has expanded into becoming a major distributor of various inspirational resource materials including a wide selection of books, video materials and Bibles.

Jesus Is Lord Colleges Foundation 
The Jesus Is Lord Colleges Foundation, Inc. is the flagship of the JIL school system. JILCF offers pre-school, elementary, high school and college courses on its main branch in Bocaue. Bulacan, Philippines. It was founded by the Spiritual Director of JIL, Bishop Bro. Eddie Villanueva in 1983. Jesus Is Lord Christian School, JIL's satellite schools, now has branches nationwide, carrying out the same mission of providing quality education to all. It has 25 branches throughout the country.

See also
 List of the largest Protestant bodies

References

External links 
 Jesus Is Lord Church Worldwide
 Jesus Is Lord Church Livestream
 JIL Church Youtube Channel

Christian organizations established in 1978
Pentecostal denominations in Asia
Christian denominations established in the 20th century
Churches in Bulacan
Evangelical denominations in Asia
Churches in Manila
Arminian denominations
Christian denominations founded in the Philippines